{{DISPLAYTITLE:C8H6N2O2}}
The molecular formula C8H6N2O2 may refer to:

 Fenadiazole, a hypnotic drug with a unique oxadiazole-based structure
 Quinoxalinedione, an organic compound; colorless solid that is soluble in polar organic solvents